Playa Jeremi is a beach on the Caribbean island of Curaçao, located close to the village of Lagun in the north-west of the island. The beach is made up partly of sand, partly of volcanic material. There are no facilities.

References
Curaçao Beaches, Tourism Curaçao

Beaches of Curaçao